Holy Rosary  may refer to:
Rosary, a set of prayer beads used in a traditional Roman Catholic devotion
The Holy Rosary, a prayer based on the rosary

See also 

 Holy Rosary Academy (disambiguation), one of several Roman Catholic schools with this name
 Holy Rosary Cathedral (disambiguation), one of several Roman Catholic cathedrals with this name
 Holy Rosary Church (disambiguation)